House doctor may refer to:
A resident physician of a hospital, rehabilitation facility, hotel, etc.
House Doctor, TV show

See also
Doctor House, main character in House (TV series)
Doctor in the House